Zhanqiao pier is located at the southern shore of Qingdao, China, off Zhongshan Road. This now  pier, constructed in 1891, was Qingdao's first wharf. The octagonal Hunian pavilion (Billowing Back and Forth Tower, loosely translated) was constructed at the end of the pier in 1930, and features as the logo of Tsingtao Brewery.

Also in the vicinity of Zhanqiao Pier is the small Qingdao Island (Xiao Qingdao), the China Navy Museum, and numerous neighborhoods featuring German colonial architecture. The coastline lights up at night with spotlights on nearby buildings and several neon billboards.

Main attractions 
 Huilan Pavilion is located in the coastal area of the Shinan District. 
 Zhongshan Road was built in 1897, during the German colonial period.

See also
Qingdao
Jiaozhou Bay

References

Buildings and structures in Qingdao
Piers in China
Tourist attractions in Qingdao